Statistics of First League of Bosnia and Herzegovina in the 1995–96 season.  It was contested only by Bosniak clubs.  Serbian clubs played in the 1995–96 First League of the Republika Srpska and the Croatian clubs in the 1995–96 First League of Herzeg-Bosnia.

Overview
It was contested by 16 teams, and NK Čelik Zenica won the championship.

Final table

Results

Top goalscorers

Source: SportSport.ba forum

References
Bosnia-Herzegovina - List of final tables (RSSSF)

First League of Bosnia and Herzegovina seasons
1995–96 in Bosnia and Herzegovina football
Bosnia